New York State Route 437 (NY 437) is a state highway located south of Auburn in Cayuga County, New York, in the United States. At  in length, it is the shortest signed state route in New York. It is a brief connector route between NY 38 and NY 38A known locally as White Bridge Road. The highway allows motorists, especially those wanting quick access to the opposite side of nearby Owasco Lake, to avoid having to cross the Owasco Outlet further downstream, in the city. NY 437 was assigned in 1970; however, the designation had appeared on maps of the area as early as two decades before.

Route description

NY 437 begins adjacent to St. Joseph Cemetery at a traffic circle with NY 38 in the town of Fleming, located south of the city of Auburn. It heads east as White Bridge Road, running along the north end of Owasco Lake. Roughly midway along its routing, NY 437 crosses the Owasco Outlet and passes into both Owasco and Emerson Park, a public park owned and maintained by Cayuga County. The route ends  later at a T-intersection with NY 38A in an area of Owasco known as Melrose Park. NY 437 serves an undeveloped, forested area west of the outlet and a mostly residential area east of the waterway. The highway is just  from end to end, making it the shortest signed state highway in New York.

The route is one of a handful of state-maintained highways in New York to culminate in a traffic circle or roundabout at one end of the route. NY 635, in neighboring Onondaga County, ends at NY 298 and exit 35 of the New York State Thruway via Carrier Circle, a large traffic circle in Syracuse. NY 140 west of Albany ends at a roundabout with NY 85 at its western end. Interstate 587 outside Kingston also ends at a roundabout with NY 28 and exit 19 of the Thruway. NY 27 also ends in an apparent traffic circle at its eastern terminus on Montauk Point; however, it is merely a closed loop created by the highway running back into itself.

History
What is now NY 437 was originally improved to state highway standards in stages during the early 20th century. The portion from the modern traffic circle with NY 38 to the Owasco Lake outlet was rebuilt in 1908 as part of State Highway 384 (SH 384), while the section between the outlet and current NY 38A was reconstructed from 1912 to 1913 as part of SH 752. Both numbers are internal, legislative designations and are thus unsigned. NY 437 was marked on contemporary maps of the area as a designation for the short east–west state highway as early as 1947; however, the designation was not officially assigned by the New York State Department of Transportation (NYSDOT) until January 1, 1970.

Major intersections

See also

References

External links

437
Transportation in Cayuga County, New York